Air Haïti was an airline based in Haiti.

History
Air Haiti SA was formed in December 1969 following the award of a five-year foreign air carrier permit by the US Civil Aeronautics Administration All-cargo scheduled services began in October 1970 between Port-au-Prince Airport, Isla Verde Airport in San Juan, Puerto Rico and Miami International Airport. Initially Curtiss C-46 Commando freighters were used but these were supplemented by leased Douglas DC-6A cargo aircraft. For a few years, Air Haïti's C-46 Commandos were a common sight at airports such as San Juan, Puerto Rico and Miami International.  The airline operated from 1969 until 1982, when it ceased operations. Air Haïti was re-launched by Air Lébér, and it owns 89% of the airline. The government of Haiti owns 11%.

Destinations 
In summer of 1981, Air Haiti operated services to:

 
 Port-au-Prince – Toussaint Louverture International Airport
 
 Miami – Miami International Airport
 New York City – John F. Kennedy International Airport

Fleet 

Air Haïti used to operate during the years: 
3 Boeing 707-331C
6 Curtiss-Wright C-46A Commando
4 Douglas DC-6A/B
2 Douglas DC-8-20

References
 Davis John M, Martin Harold G, and Whittle John A. The Curtiss C-46 Commando 1978. Air-ritain (Historians) ltd. .

Defunct airlines of Haiti
Airlines established in 1969
1969 establishments in Haiti
Airlines disestablished in 1982
1982 disestablishments in North America